Cieply or Ciepły ("warm" in Polish) is a surname. Notable people include:

 Michael Cieply (born 1951), American journalist
 Olgierd Ciepły (1936–2007), Polish hammer thrower
 Teresa Ciepły (1937–2006), Polish sprinter and hurdler

See also
 

Polish-language surnames